The Newton Union Schoolhouse, also known as Champion School, in Haddon Township, Camden County, New Jersey, United States, was a one-room schoolhouse that was built in 1821. It was listed on the National Register of Historic Places in 1988.

References

School buildings on the National Register of Historic Places in New Jersey
School buildings completed in 1821
Buildings and structures in Camden, New Jersey
Schools in Camden County, New Jersey
Defunct schools in New Jersey
National Register of Historic Places in Camden County, New Jersey
Haddon Township, New Jersey